Mokpo National Maritime University is a national university located in Mokpo, South Korea.

Organization

President

Committee

University Headquarters
Office of Academic Affairs
Office of Admissions and Student Affairs
Office of Planning Affairs
Office of Administrative Affairs

Affiliated Departments
Office of Industry-Academic Cooperation Foundation
Office of Training and Recruitment
International Exchange & Education Center
LINC(Leaders in INdustry-university Cooperation)+ Agency
Startup Support Foundation
The Support Center for Teacher Education
Human Right Center
Seafarers Policy Research Center
Library
Information Computing Center
Training Ship
Cadet Dormitory
Residence Hall
Office of GPS Professional Development
Student Counseling Center
The School of Lifelong Education
Marine Simulation Center
Marine Engineering Workshop
Marine Leports Center
Regional Communication Center
Museum
Marine Industry Research Institute
Research Institute of Mechanics & Electronics
NAVY ROTC

Academics

College of Maritime Sciences

Division of Navigation Science
Department of Nautical Science
Department of Ship Operation
Department of Maritime Traffic Management
Department of Marine Safety System

Division of Maritime Transportation
Department of Nautical Science
Department of Logistic System
Department of Shipping Management
Department of Autonomous Operations for Smart Ship

Division of Navigation and Information System
Department of Nautical Science
Department of Information Communication

Division of Marine Engineering System
Department of Marine Engineering
Department of Mechanical Application
Department of Electric & Control Engineering

Division of Coast Guard
Department of Marine Engineering
Department of Ocean Power System
Department of Marine Police Science

Division of Marine Mechatronics
Department of Marine Engineering
Department of Electromechanical Engineering

Division of Naval Officer Science
Department of Nautical Science
Department of Marine Engineering
Department of Military Science

College of Maritime Engineering
Department of Computer Engineering
Department of Naval Architecture & Ocean Engineering
Department of Environmental Engineering & Biotechnology
Department of Ocean Civil Engineering

Graduate schools
Department of Maritime Transportation System
Department of Marine Engineering
Department of Coast guard
Department of Ocean System Engineering
Department of Marine Electronics and Communication and Computer Engineering

Major Organizations of University

Office of Academic Affairs 
The office is composed of the Faculty Affairs Team and the Student Affairs Team in charge of faculty HR, faculty performance management, academic/research support, issuance of faculty certificates, operation of education courses and academic schedules, management of classes and school records, awarding of degrees, etc.

Office of Admissions and Student Affairs 
Responsible for selecting excellent students and supporting the school life of enrolled students

Office of Planning Affairs 
In preparation of the internalization, openness and specialization of the educational environment in the 21st century, it is in charge of establishing comprehensive plans for university development, and presenting directions of the university development through the improvement of various evaluations and systems on university operation and the implementation of government financing projects.

Office of Administrative Affairs 
Responsible for supporting each administrative department to facilitate educational activities such as HR and service management, faculty payroll and welfare, budget execution, product purchase and management, facility construction and maintenance, etc.

Office of Training and Recruitment 
In accordance with the standards (STCW Convention) set by the International Maritime Organization (IMO), it is in charge of supporting students' boarding practices and trainings, supporting safe operation of training ships and supporting students' employment.

Office of International Affairs 
The officefocuses on improving students' foreign language skills in line with the era of internationalization and is in charge of language training to educate Korean culture to foreign students for the globalization of the campus.

Industry-Academic Cooperation Foundation 
A special corporation established under 「the Act on Industrial Education Promotion and Industry-Academic Cooperation Promotion」 to promote and develop industrial-academic cooperation researches and projects of the university and is in charge of managing industrial-academic cooperation projects of the university and systematically supporting industrial-academic cooperation activities.

History

1950-2000 
1950. 04. 05
	University was founded as Mokpo fisheries and Marine High School.

1979. 03. 01
	Promoted to Mokpo Merchant Marine College.

1993. 03. 01 
Upgrade to Mokpo National Maritime University.
(3 Departments : Nautical Science, Marine Engineering Science, Communication Science)

1995. 03. 01 
Two new Departments were added. (Marine Electronic Engineering Science, Naval Architecture & Ocean Engineering Science)

1996. 03. 01
	University was reorganized into 4 Division.
(Maritime Transportation System, Marine Engineering, Marine Electronics and Communication Engineering, Ocean System Engineering)

1997. 03. 01
	TGraduate School was established.

1999. 03. 01 
Department of Maritime Police Science was established in the divisions of Marine Engineering and Maritime Transportain System. Doctoral program was established in Graduate school.

2001-2010 
2001. 07. 26
	Industrial graduate school was established.

2002. 11. 09
	Department of Computer Science & Engineering was added to the division of Marine Electronics and communication Engineering

2003. 04. 25
	Training ship SAENURI was started on a voyage.

2003. 07. 07 
MMU Lifelong Education Program was established.

2004. 08. 03 
Residence Hall was completed.

2005. 06. 16 
Marine Simulation Center was established.

2006. 01. 05 
MMU Honam Sea Grant College Program was established.

2007. 01. 07 
MMU Language Education Center was established

2007. 10. 01
	MMU New Main Building was officially opened.

2008. 10. 28
	Opened the Marine Poetry Monument Park.

2009. 01. 30
	Opened the University History Hall.

2009. 05. 14
	Opened Jeonnam Branch of Korea Marine Equipment Research Institute.

2011-2020 
2011. 03. 01
	Established colleges (College of Maritime Sciences and College of Maritime Engineering).

2011. 08. 31
	Completed the new construction of Cadet Dormitory (a total of 10 floors, 8,953 m2 of gross area and 420 rooms).

2011. 09. 23
	Opened Jeonnam Yachting License Test Center.

2012. 03. 01
	Reorganized into 3 divisions (College of Maritime Sciences) and 6 departments (College of Maritime Engineering) and established Women's School Corps.

2013. 07. 11
	Selected as a university sponsored for education capacity enhancement project for 6 consecutive years.

2014. 07. 11
	Completed the new library building (3 floors and 1 basement, 4,800 m2 of gross area)

2015. 06. 29
	Completed Ocean Engineering Building, Marine College of Maritime Engineering (4 floors and 1 basement, 6,834 m2 of gross area)

2016. 04. 07
	Approval of the establishment of Division of Naval Officer Science from Ministry of Education.

2017. 03. 15
	Completed the small-ship station facility.

2018. 03. 01
	Selected as a university of education internalization competency certification

2018. 06. 19
	Confirmation of the North-port port facility reserve (2 lots, 160,821 m2) for the university land

2018. 08. 31
	Built Student Hall (4 floors, 5,373 m2 of gross area)

2018. 12. 27
	Delivery and launch of training ship, SEGERO

2019. 06. 26
	Started the construction of Ship Repair Supporting Center (2,913 m2 of gross area)

2020. 02. 11
	Completed Ship Repair Supporting Center

Specialized Fields of University

Special-purposed national university for educating marine-engineer manpower
Marine-specialization education-oriented university
Raising professional manpower for realizing maritime power country
Raising the manpower of maritime transport accounting for 99.7% of the international logistics
Serving as the 4th army in the event of national emergency

National support for marine special-purpose university
National funding such as some tuition, accommodation and clothing
Mandatory Cadet Dormitory adaptation training
Applying military service exemption to mandatory boarding
Two state-of-the-art training ships and operation support

Curriculum management with STCW international convention under the UN
Operation of curriculum that meets the international standards
Feedback through 5-year cycle assessment on international marine engineering quality

Major Achievements
Employment rate of 2019: 80.6% (based on 2018 graduates)
Producing civil servants in the marine and fisheries sector
Selected as an accredited university for capacity certification on internationalization of education
Selected as an autonomous improvement university for university's basic competency diagnosis
Approval of teacher training program
Selected for step 2 project of the Social Customization Department (LINC+) of the Ministry of Education
Confirmation of the North-port facility site reserve as the university land (2 lots, 160,821 m2)
Acquisition of the 2nd cycle university institution assessment certification

See also
List of national universities in South Korea
List of universities and colleges in South Korea
Education in Korea

External links 
  

Mokpo
National universities and colleges in South Korea
Universities and colleges in South Jeolla Province
Educational institutions established in 1948
1948 establishments in Korea